Nicole Notat, born 26 July 1947 in Châtrices, Marne, is the former secretary general of the union CFDT. She is currently founder and president of Vigeo, a company committed to a concept of sustainable development.

Notat is a member of the Group of Reflection on the Future of Europe chaired by Felipe Gonzalez and established by the European Council. The group's mission is to propose to the European Council of March 2010 a strategic roadmap for Europe in 2020–2030. Since 2010, Notat has served as President of Le Siècle, the first woman to do so.

She was the first woman to lead a trade union in France.

References

French trade union leaders
French women trade unionists
1947 births
People from Marne (department)
French officials of the European Union
Living people
French women company founders
Women trade union leaders